Associació Esportiva Badalonès, also known as Badalonès-Fruits Secs Corbera for sponsorship reasons, is an amateur basketball team based in Badalona, Catalonia, Spain. The team was founded in 1990, inside the Col·legi Badalonès, a school of Badalona. They play in Copa Catalunya

Season by season

References and notes

External links
Official website
Profile in Basquetcatala.cat 

Catalan basketball teams
Basketball teams established in 1990
Sport in Badalona